is a Japanese politician of the Liberal Democratic Party, a member of the House of Councillors in the Diet (national legislature). A native of Toyohashi, Aichi and graduate of Waseda University, he was elected for the first time in 1990 after working at the public broadcaster NHK.

References

External links 
 Official website in Japanese.

Members of the House of Representatives (Japan)
Members of the House of Councillors (Japan)
Living people
1938 births
Liberal Democratic Party (Japan) politicians
People from Toyohashi
Waseda University alumni